Martin "Musa" Musaubach(born May 23, 1982, in La Plata, Argentina) is an Argentine band-leading pianist, composer, arranger and producer in MUSA's.

About

Musa was the member of jazz, blues and Latin music bands including Labrusca, Zoe, 5 Australes, Reina Venus, Blues Oil and Bin Bin, which Labrusca was the first band he joined in his hometown La Plata—he was only at the early age of 13, as a keyboardist and the youngest member in the band.

From around 2007 Musa started his career in China playing live music in some famous jazz bars with his band members as MUSAS. By 2011 he was the musical director in Shangri-La Summit Wing Hotel (Beijing), and leading his own Latin jazz band MUSA's Trio with bass/ double bassist Lautaro "LuKa" Bellucca and drummer/ percussionist Adriano "Gaofei" Moreira. In the 3rd quarter of 2011, accompanied by LuKa and Gaofei, Musa moved to Taipei to join Gary Chaw Project SENSATION (the band, so as a music project) as the key pianist and composer with the Malaysian Chinese vocalist Gary Chaw and Taiwanese compose-producer Michael Tu.

Musa is now living in Taipei as his new home and working location, continued to play music in local jazz bars and venues with his bandmates and different musicians, at the same time collaborating with mainstream record labels and artists in live performing or recording albums.

Releases

 Album

3690 - debut studio album - Aug 16 2013

All tracks: Piano by Martin Musaubach; Bass /Double Bass by Lautaro Bellucca; Drums & Percussion by Adriano Moreira 
Track 1-5: written and arranged by Martin Musaubach 
Track 6: written by Lautaro Bellucca, arranged by Martin Musaubach 
Track 7: written by Martin Musaubach; arranged by Martin Musaubach & Michael Tu 
Track 8: written and vocal by Mandy Gaines; arranged by Martin Musaubach; erhu by Tanghsuan Lo; guitars by Fabio Moreira

Release: (noted) Aug 16 2013; (in stores) Aug 23 2013 
Publish label: AsiaMuse Entertainment 
Producer: Martin Musaubach 
Executive producer: Michael Tu 
Recording engineer: Micky Yang and Alex Lee 
Mastering engineer: Michael Tu

Track 1-7 recorded in Megaforce Studios, Taipei 
Track 8 recorded in Platinum Studio, Taipei

See also
 MUSA's
 SENSATION

References

1982 births
Living people
Argentine composers
Argentine jazz pianists
Jazz composers
Jazz arrangers
Jazz bandleaders
Tango musicians
People from La Plata
Musicians from Taipei
21st-century pianists